Dovania mirei is a moth of the  family Sphingidae. It is known from Nigeria.

References

Sphingini
Moths described in 2000